Adrian Sager (born 17 March 1987) is a Swiss professional footballer who plays as a defender. His clubs include SC Cham and FC Lucerne.

See also
Football in Switzerland
List of football clubs in Switzerland

References

1987 births
Living people
Swiss men's footballers
SC Cham players
FC Luzern players
Association football defenders